River of Exploding Durians  is a 2014 Malaysian drama film directed by Edmund Yeo. It is his first full-length film. It follows the high school students and their history teacher as they fight against the construction of a potentially radioactive rare earth plant. The film had its world premiere at the 2014 Tokyo International Film Festival, where it was competed for the main prize.

The film also had its European premiere at the 2015 International Film Festival Rotterdam, under the Bright Future section. In addition, the film had its U.S. premiere at CAAMFest in San Francisco.

Plot 
When a rare earth plant is being built near a coastal town, its inhabitants fall into despair, fearful of its radioactive effects. Ming, a high school student, is indifferent towards the changes. All he cares about is spending idyllic afternoons with the childhood friend he secretly loves, Mei Ann.

Meanwhile. Ming's history teacher, Ms. Lim, has started an activist group to protest against the construction. She recruits her favourite student, Hui Ling, to join her. Their idealism is severely tested.

As the construction goes on, they are all drawn into a chain of events that changes their lives irrevocably.

Cast 
Zhu Zhi-Ying as Teacher Lim
Koe Shern as Ming
Daphne Low as Hui Ling
Joey Leong as Mei Ann
Pearlly Chua as Headmistress Lee
Mayjune as Sandy
Azman Hassan as Plant Manager
Ivan Tai as Guo Xiang 
Kenji Sawahii as Mei Ann's Father
Kin Wah Chew as Ming's Father (as Chew Kin Wah)

Awards and nominations

External links 

Official Facebook Page

2014 films
Malaysian drama films
Chinese-language Malaysian films